is a Japanese football player for Nara Club.

Club statistics
Updated to 18 November 2018.

References

External links
Profile at Nara Club
Profile at Fujieda MYFC

1991 births
Living people
Kansai University alumni
Association football people from Osaka Prefecture
Japanese footballers
J3 League players
Japan Football League players
FC Ryukyu players
Renofa Yamaguchi FC players
Fujieda MYFC players
Nara Club players
Association football defenders